Ivan Laća (born 15 February 2003) is a Croatian professional football player who plays for Rudeš.

Club career 
He made his debut for HNK Šibenik on the 28 September 2019, in a 1-0 2. HNL home win against NK Solin. Under the management Krunoslav Rendulić he helped his side reach promotion to the Croatian First Football League.

He regularly appeared in the first division the following season, struggling to gain some more time however early 2021, as he was reaching the end of its contract next summer.

References

External links

2003 births
Living people
Sportspeople from Šibenik
Association football forwards
Croatian footballers
Croatia youth international footballers
HNK Šibenik players
GNK Dinamo Zagreb II players
NK Rudeš players
First Football League (Croatia) players
Croatian Football League players